Upendra Yadav (born 8 October 1996) is an Indian first-class cricketer who plays for Railways. He made his first-class debut for Uttar Pradesh in the 2016–17 Ranji Trophy on 29 November 2016. He made his List A debut for Uttar Pradesh in the 2017–18 Vijay Hazare Trophy on 5 February 2018.

References

External links
 

1996 births
Living people
Indian cricketers
Uttar Pradesh cricketers
Wicket-keepers